Luciocyprinus striolatus is a species of endangered cyprinid in the genus Luciocyprinus.

References

Cyprinidae
Cyprinid fish of Asia
Fish of Laos
Freshwater fish of China
Endangered fish